Juszczak may refer to:

Joe Juszczak (Joe Just) (1916–2003), Major League Baseball catcher
Katarzyna Juszczak (born 1972), retired amateur Polish-born Italian judoka and freestyle wrestler
Piotr Juszczak (born 1988), Polish rower
Włodzimierz Juszczak OSBM (born 1957), bishop ordinary of the Wrocław-Gdańsk Eparchy of the Ukrainian Greek Catholic Church
Zbigniew Juszczak (born 1975), Polish former Olympic field hockey player
Zbigniew Juszczak (field hockey, born 1946) (born 1946), Polish field hockey player

See also
Juszczyk